A Cold Wind Blows or variants may refer to:

A Cold Wind Blows (game), a game

Music
Cold Wind Blows, album Colwell-Winfield Blues Band 1968
A Cold Wind Blows, a 1966 UK album and title track composed and sung by Cyril Tawney, Matt McGinn, Johnny Handle and Alasdair Clayre
"Cold Wind Blows", song by Eminem from Recovery (Eminem album)
"Where the Cold Wind Blows",	Nickel Eye	The Time of the Assassins